The Coopers Creek, a perennial stream of the Richmond River catchment, is located in Northern Rivers region in the state of New South Wales, Australia.

Location and features
The river flows generally south southeast and then south southwest, joined by two minor tributaries before reaching its confluence with the Wilsons River near Bexhill. The river descends  over its  course.

Etymology
The river is believed to be named in honour of Alec Cooper, a cedar cutter working in the district surrounding the river during the early 1880s.

See also

 Rivers of New South Wales
 List of rivers of New South Wales (A-K)
 List of rivers of Australia

References

External links
 

 

Northern Rivers
Rivers of New South Wales
City of Lismore